Retrospektïẁ (Parts I+II) is a live album by French rock band Magma. Released in 1981, it documents live recordings from a series of Magma reunion shows in Paris on 9, 10 and 11 June 1980. It was originally released on RCA, and has been re-released on Seventh Records.

Track listing

LP track listing

Disc one

Side One
 "Mëkanïk Dëstruktïẁ Kömmandöh - Pt. 1" - 22:37

Side Two
 "Mëkanïk Dëstruktïẁ Kömmandöh - Pt. 2" - 17:20

Disc two

Side three
 "Theusz Hamtaahk - Pt. 1" - 17:10

Side four
 "Theusz Hamtaahk - Pt. 2" - 19:05

CD track listing 
 "Theusz Hamtaahk (1st movement)" - 36:05
 "Mëkanïk Dëstruktïẁ Kömmandöh (3rd movement of Theusz Hamtaahk)"  40:04

Legacy
The version of "Theusz Hamtaahk" available here is considered the definitive version. Also, many people prefer the version of Mëkanïk Dëstruktïẁ Kömmandöh here because the drums are much louder in the mix.

Personnel 
 Klaus Blasquiz – vocals
 Stella Vander – vocals
 Liza Deluxe – vocals
 Claire Laborde – vocals (2)
 Maria Popkiewicz – vocals (2)
 Didier Lockwood – violin
 Gabriel Federow – guitar
 Jean Luc Chevalier – guitar (2)
 Patrick Gauthier – keyboards
 Benoit Widemann – keyboards
 Bernard Paganotti – bass
 Christian Vander – drums, keyboards, vocals

References

External links 
 Retrospektïẁ (Parts I+II) at www.seventhrecords.com
 Retrospektïẁ (Parts I+II) at www.progarchives.com
 Retrospektïẁ (Parts I+II) at www.allmusic.com

Magma (band) albums
1981 live albums
RCA Records live albums